Joice Sorongan (born October 18, 1975) is a former Indonesian footballer and current Goalkeeping coach of Persipura Jayapura.

Club statistics

References

External links

1975 births
Living people
Sportspeople from Central Sulawesi
Indonesian footballers
Liga 1 (Indonesia) players
Mitra Kukar players
Mitra Kukar managers
Badak Lampung F.C. managers
Badak Lampung F.C.
Indonesian Premier Division players
Persidafon Dafonsoro players
Persikab Bandung players
Persiram Raja Ampat players
Persita Tangerang players
Persma Manado players
Association football goalkeepers
Indonesian football managers